Luís Fernando or Luiz Fernando is a given name. Notable people with the name include:

Luiz Fernando Guimarães (born 1949), Brazilian actor
Luís Fernando Gaúcho,  (born 1955), Brazilian footballer
Luiz Fernando Carvalho (born 1960), Brazilian director, producer, writer and film editor
Luis Fernando Sepúlveda (born 1974), Chilean track and road cyclist
Luiz Fernando Uva (born 1977), Brazilian race car driver
Luis Fernando Camacho (born 1979), Bolivian businessman and politician
Luís Fernando (footballer, born 1983), Luís Fernando Rodrigues dos Santos, Brazilian football striker
Luiz Fernando (footballer, born February 1988), Luiz Fernando Pongelupe Machado, Brazilian football goalkeeper
Luiz Fernando (footballer, born July 1988), Luiz Fernando Corrêa Sales, Brazilian football attacking midfielder
Luiz Fernando (footballer, born 1995), Luiz Fernando Ferreira Maximiniano, Brazilian football defensive midfielder
Luiz Fernando (footballer, born 1996), Luiz Fernando Moraes dos Santos, Brazilian football attacking midfielder
Luiz Fernando (footballer, born 1997), Luiz Fernando Nascimento, Brazilian football midfielder
Luiz Fernando (footballer, born 1999), Luiz Fernando Ferreira de Souza, Brazilian football forward

See also
Luis
Fernando

Portuguese masculine given names